In the Indian education system of some Indian states, the Pre-University Course (PUC) or Pre-Degree Course (PDC) is referred to as Intermediate or +2 Course, which is an two-year senior secondary education course that succeeds the tenth grade (known as SSLC or SSC in such states, equivalent to sophomore in the US system) and precedes to the completion of an Senior Secondary Course. The First Year of the PUC is commonly referred to as 1st PUC or Class 11th, (known in most other Indian states as +1 or HSC corresponding to the US junior year or generally the eleventh grade), and the Second Year of the PUC as 2nd PUC or Class 12th (known in most other Indian states as +2 or HSC, corresponding to the US senior year or the twelfth grade in general). A college which offers the PUC is simply known as a 'PU college' or 'Intermediate College' which is also referred to as junior college. 

In India, The national and almost all other state education boards consider education up to the Class 12th as simply "Schooling" as the education upto this class comes under school education. But in some state education boards in India consider the Classes 11th and 12th education as "PUC/PDC" or "Intermediate Course" as this course is conducted only in Junior Colleges and not in High Schools like other national and state education boards because these state education boards provide the schooling only in Class 10th. Also, this type of Junior Collegiate Education or PUC/Intermediate Course education for Senior Secondary Classes (Classes 11th-12th) exists only in the education boards of some Indian states as majority of national and state education boards provide schooling till class 12th. However, The education system across the country follows the  same pattern as follows like 10 + 2 + (3, 4, or 5) pattern is followed: a bachelor's degree (of three, four, or five years) requires at least ten years of primary and secondary education in schools followed by two years of higher secondary education in Higher Secondary Schools (Majority Of National and State Education Boards) and Junior Colleges (Some State Education Boards).

The PUC certificate is a certification obtained by the Junior College students upon the successful completion of the Higher Secondary Examination at the end of study at the higher secondary level in India. The PUC Certificate is obtained on passing the “2nd PUC (Class 12th) Public Examination” which is commonly known as “Class 12th Board Examinations” in India in general. A person desiring admission to an Indian university must pass this course, which can be considered as a degree bridge course to prepare students for university education.

For example, the state of Karnataka conducts Board Examinations at the end of the 2nd Year PUC for university admissions. This has three program streams with options focusing on science, commerce and arts, respectively. Students desiring to study professional programs in Karnataka must pass the science stream of this exam and qualify through the Common Entrance Test of the state. Recently, the Karnataka PUC Board made the first-year PUC exams public, to filter out low-scoring students and improve overall average scores. Only about 40% of students usually pass the exam, and only about 1.5% score above 85% overall.

Courses after PUC 
Students who have completed the PUC in the science stream can enroll in courses such as mathematics, natural sciences, nursing, pharmacy, agriculture, engineering or medicine. They can also enroll for a pure-sciences B.Sc. Admission to these courses depends upon marks scored in PUC exams conducted by the institutes or by the state board.

Students who succeed in the commerce stream may enroll in a graduate Bachelor of Commerce or Bachelor of Business Management degree program at an Indian university.

Those who have passed the arts-stream PUC can opt to study for a Bachelor of Arts (B.A) or Diploma in Education (DEd), Bachelor of Social Work (BSW), or may be admitted to vocational programs in fashion design — offered by the National Institute of Fashion Design (NIFT) — or apparel and knitwear manufacturing.

References

External links
 General information
Official website for PUC results

Education in India
Junior colleges in India